Kiyoko Sugimura (born 22 September 1929) is a Japanese athlete.  She won gold medals in the  relay, individual 100 metres and long jump in the 1951 Asian Games.

References

Athletes (track and field) at the 1951 Asian Games
Japanese female sprinters
Asian Games gold medalists for Japan
Asian Games medalists in athletics (track and field)
Medalists at the 1951 Asian Games
1929 births
Possibly living people